Mahathapar is a village of Ballia district in the Indian state of Uttar Pradesh. Its population is 1889, per the 2011 Census. Mahthapar's nearest railway station is Ballia.

References 

Cities and towns in Ballia district